The 2020 Alamo Bowl was a college football bowl game played on December 29, 2020, with kickoff scheduled for 9:00 p.m. EST (8:00 p.m. local CST) on ESPN. It was the 28th edition of the Alamo Bowl, and was one of the 2020–21 bowl games concluding the 2020 FBS football season. Sponsored by Valero Energy, the game was officially known as the Valero Alamo Bowl.

Teams
The game featured Texas of the Big 12 Conference and Colorado of the Pac-12 Conference, consistent with the bowl's conference tie-ins. The programs had previously met 18 times, most recently in 2009, with Texas holding an 11–7 edge. Their prior meetings include one bowl game, the 1975 Astro-Bluebonnet Bowl, won by Texas.

Texas Longhorns

Texas entered the bowl with a 6–3 record (5–3 in conference), ranked 20th in the AP Poll and CFP rankings. Their losses were to TCU, Oklahoma, and ranked Iowa State. Texas had a 3–1 record in four prior Alamo Bowls, most recently winning the 2019 edition.

Colorado Buffaloes

Colorado entered the bowl with a 4–1 record (3–1 in conference); their loss was to Utah. Colorado had played in two prior Alamo Bowls, losing the 2002 and 2016 editions.

Game summary

Statistics

References

External links

Game statistics at statbroadcast.com

Alamo Bowl
Alamo Bowl
Alamo Bowl
Alamo Bowl
Texas Longhorns football bowl games
Colorado Buffaloes football bowl games